Kelvin Mutale (20 September 1969 – 27 April 1993) was a Zambian footballer and member of the national team. He was among those killed in the crash of the team plane in Gabon in 1993.

Career
Mutale played club football for NCZ F.C. in kafue before joining Nkana F.C. in Zambia and Ettifaq FC in Saudi Arabia.

Mutale made several appearances for the Zambia national football team, including four FIFA World Cup qualifying matches.

References

External links

1969 births
1993 deaths
Zambian footballers
Zambian expatriate footballers
Zambian expatriate sportspeople in Saudi Arabia
Zambia international footballers
Victims of aviation accidents or incidents in Gabon
Nkana F.C. players
Ettifaq FC players
Expatriate footballers in Saudi Arabia
Saudi Professional League players
Association football forwards
Footballers killed in the 1993 Zambia national football team plane crash